The Men's Hammer Throw event at the 2009 World Championships in Athletics was held at the Olympic Stadium on August 15 and August 17. With reigning champion Ivan Tsikhan banned from competition for doping offences, the 2008 Olympic gold and silver medallists Primož Kozmus and Krisztián Pars were the favourites in the event. Pars entered the competition with a world-leading throw of 81.43 m and an 18 competition win-streak. Belarusian Yuriy Shayunov and Russian Aleksey Zagornyi, the only other athletes to have thrown over eighty metres twice that season prior to the championships, were identified as possible podium finishers. Nicola Vizzoni, Igor Sokolov, Olli-Pekka Karjalainen, Szymon Ziółkowski, Koji Murofushi, and Libor Charfreitag were all predicted to have an outside chance of a medal.

On the first day of competition, Kozmus was the first to pass the automatic qualifying mark of 77.50 m. Pars had the best effort of the day with 78.68 m, while former world champion Ziółkowski led group A with a throw of 77.89 m. Aspiring medallists Sokolov, Shayunov and Karjalainen all failed to progress to the final of the competition. On the final day of the hammer throw, the favourite Kozmus delivered a best of 80.15 m to take the gold medal, Slovenia's first ever in the World Championships. Ziółkowski's 79.30 m, the best of his season, was enough to take the silver – his first medal at a major championships since 2005. The level of the competition, however, failed to live up to expectations: the world-leader Pars started poorly and, after a number of fouls, he never regained ground and finished in fourth place. Furthermore, the performance of bronze medallist Zagornyi (78.09) was the shortest-ever distance of a medal winner in championship history.

Medalists

Abbreviations
All results shown are in metres

Records

Qualification standards

Schedule

Results

Qualification
Qualification: Qualifying Performance 77.50 (Q) or at least 12 best performers (q) advance to the final.

Key:  NM = no mark (i.e. no valid result), Q = qualification by place in heat, q = qualification by overall place

Final

Key:  NM = no mark (i.e. no valid result), SB = Seasonal best

See also
2009 Hammer Throw Year Ranking

References
General
Hammer throw results. IAAF. Retrieved on 2009-08-15.
 hammerthrow.wz
Specific

Hammer throw
Hammer throw at the World Athletics Championships